Love Stories is a studio album by Brazilian jazz pianist and singer Eliane Elias. The album was released by Concord on August 30, 2019.

Background
The label's site mentions that Love Stories is an orchestral album, demonstrating Elias’ mastery and preeminence as a multifaceted artist—a vocalist, pianist, arranger, composer, lyricist, and producer. The vocal parts are sung almost entirely in English. The album contains three original compositions as well as seven standards, including songs by Frank Sinatra and Antonio Carlos Jobim, of whom Elias is a celebrated interpreter.

Reception
Kerille McDowall of DownBeat awarded the album five stars out of five and wrote, "Elias’ intoxicating vocals emote the ambient calm of a forest after a soft rain; her vibrancy is a force unto itself. With powerful artistry, her naturally prodigious talent is even stronger as the years pass—a feat capable only by the true elites of the music world." Andrew Gilbert of JazzTimes stated "Intimate and sweeping, Love Stories offers a vivifying reminder of the still unplumbed depths of this particular well, and demonstrates how a master of quietude can transform just about any song into a bossa nova vehicle." Derek Ansell writing for Jazz Journal commented, "...a soft-focus Brazilian crooning style with the strings sweeping around her and the occasional snippet of a brass or reed solo."

Track listing

Personnel
Eliane Elias – vocals and piano
Marc Johnson – bass
Mark Kibble – background vocal
Marcus Teixeira – guitar
Daniel Santiago – guitar
Roberto Menescal – guitar
Edu Ribeiro – drums
Rafael Barata – drums
Paulo Braga – drums
Celso De Almeida – drums

References

External links

2019 albums
Eliane Elias albums